Allen Flanigan (born April 24, 2001) is an American college basketball player for the Auburn Tigers of the Southeastern Conference (SEC).

High school career
Flanigan played basketball for Parkview Arts and Science Magnet High School in Little Rock, Arkansas under the coaching of his grandfather, Al, and won two state championships. He committed to playing college basketball for Auburn, joining his father, Wes, an assistant coach and former player with the program.

College career
As a freshman at Auburn, Flanigan came off the bench and averaged 3.2 points per game. On January 23, 2021, he recorded a sophomore season-high 24 points, six rebounds and four assists in a 109–86 win over South Carolina. As a sophomore, Flanigan averaged 14.3 points, 5.5 rebounds and 2.9 assists per game. On September 7, 2021, it was announced that Flanigan would miss 12 to 14 weeks due to undergoing a surgical procedure on his right Achilles tendon. He averaged 6.3 points, 3.5 rebounds, and 1.3 assists per game as a junior.

Career statistics

College

|-
| style="text-align:left;"| 2019–20
| style="text-align:left;"| Auburn
| 31 || 3 || 13.8 || .394 || .143 || .459 || 2.7 || .4 || .3 || .1 || 3.2
|-
| style="text-align:left;"| 2020–21
| style="text-align:left;"| Auburn
| 27 || 27 || 30.4 || .455 || .338 || .776 || 5.5 || 2.9 || .9 || .2 || 14.3
|-
| style="text-align:left;"| 2021–22
| style="text-align:left;"| Auburn
| 22 || 20 || 24.5 || .395 || .205 || .647 || 3.5 || 1.3 || .6 || .1 || 6.3
|- class="sortbottom"
| style="text-align:center;" colspan="2"| Career
| 80 || 50 || 22.4 || .428 || .279 || .690 || 3.9 || 1.5 || .6 || .1 || 7.8

References

External links
Auburn Tigers bio

2001 births
Living people
American men's basketball players
Basketball players from Arkansas
Sportspeople from Little Rock, Arkansas
Shooting guards
Auburn Tigers men's basketball players